"I Don't Need No Doctor" is an R&B song written by Nick Ashford, Valerie Simpson, and Jo Armstead. First released by Ashford on Verve in August 1966, it went nowhere. It was then picked up and recorded by Ray Charles and released in October 1966. Over the years, it has been covered by bands such as garage rock band The Chocolate Watchband in 1969, Humble Pie in 1971 , New Riders of the Purple Sage in 1972, metal band W.A.S.P. in 1986, by rock band Great White in 1987, and by the garage punk band The Nomads in 1989. Styx also covered this song. Humble Pie's version reached No. 73 on the Billboard Hot 100 singles chart and No. 72 in Canada.

Venezuelan Hard Rock Blues band,  La Banda De Casablanca recorded in their recording called El Sueño

Jazz guitarist John Scofield recorded a version for his album That's What I Say: John Scofield Plays the Music of Ray Charles in 2005, featuring blues guitarist John Mayer on additional guitar and vocals. Mayer covered the song again with his band during his tour in summer 2007. A version recorded live during a Los Angeles show during that tour is available on Mayer's CD/DVD release Where the Light Is.  A Ray Charles tribute album also provided the impetus for jazz singer Roseanna Vitro's version – specifically, her 1997 CD, Catchin’ Some Rays: The Music of Ray Charles

In 2004 the blues singer Beth Hart performed a live version with her band, shown on the DVD Live at Paradiso.

In 2005, the Brazilian hard rock band Dr. Sin recorded a version for their sixth album, Listen to the Doctors, a covers album with only songs with the word 'Doctor' in the title. The version of Dr. Sin was inspired by the Humble Pie version.

Singer-songwriter Joan Osborne covered the song on her 2012 album Bring It On Home. It was also covered on 1980s Mod band Secret Affair's 2012 album release Soho Dreams. In 2014, Demented Scumcats covered the song on their album Splatter Baby in a psychobilly version.

In 2015, 1960s garage-rock band The Sonics covered the song on their album This Is The Sonics.

In 2016, the song appeared in the Lost in Paris Blues Band self-titled album, including Paul Personne, Ron Thal, and blues guitar star Robben Ford.

In 2017 and 2018, the hard rock, previously glam metal, band Vixen performed the song in their live concerts in most of their tours in the Western world. In contrast to all of the band's past performances, bass guitarist Share Ross sang lead vocals, rather than the then long-time singer Janet Gardner, at Ross's request to prove her competency in singing.

See also
Ray Charles discography

References

External links
www.raycharles.com

Songs about physicians
1966 singles
1971 singles
Songs written by Valerie Simpson
Songs written by Nickolas Ashford
Peter Frampton songs
Ray Charles songs
Humble Pie (band) songs
W.A.S.P. songs
Great White songs
Songs written by Jo Armstead
1966 songs
ABC Records singles
A&M Records singles